Skoufas Kompoti is a Greek football club, based in Kompoti, Arta.

https://skoufasfc.gr/  Official Webpage

Honors

Domestic Titles and honors
 FCA Arta Champions: 8
 1996-97, 1998–99, 2000–01, 2006–07, 2012-2013, 2014-2015, 2016–17, 2019-20
 FCA Arta Cup Winners: 8
 1997-98, 1999-00, 2000–01, 2005–06, 2006–07, 2007–08, 2008–09, 2016-17

Football clubs in Epirus
Arta (regional unit)
Association football clubs established in 1952
1952 establishments in Greece
Gamma Ethniki clubs